Awaruwaunau Airport  is an airport serving the village of Awarewaunau, an Amerindian village in the Upper Takutu-Upper Essequibo Region of Guyana.

See also

 List of airports in Guyana
 Transport in Guyana

References

External links
OpenStreetMap - Awaruwaunau
OurAirports - Awaruwaunau
SkyVector Aeronautical Charts

Airports in Guyana